Benld  is a city in Macoupin County, Illinois, United States. The population was 1,464 at the 2020 census, down from 1,556 in 2010. It is located in the Metro-East portion of the Greater St. Louis metropolitan area.

Benld was declared the "most difficult to pronounce" place name in the state of Illinois by Reader's Digest.

History
Benld was established in 1903. The name derives from founder Benjamin L. Dorsey (d. June 19, 1895), who was responsible for gaining the land on which the town was built and coal mining rights. "Benld" is the combination of Dorsey's first name and his middle and last initial. 

On September 29, 1938, a meteorite landed in Benld, marking only the third meteorite landing in Illinois since records were kept. It is one of the few known meteorites to strike a man-made object, punching a hole in the roof of Edward McCain's garage and embedding itself in the seat of his 1928 Pontiac coupe. A neighbor, Mrs. Carl Crum, was standing about fifty feet from the impact and may be the individual who came closest to being struck by a meteorite in history up to that time. The meteorite and portions of the car are now on display at the Field Museum of Natural History in Chicago.

In March 2009, the seven-year-old Benld Elementary school was damaged beyond repair and ultimately condemned. The damage was caused by mine subsidence and left more than 700 students without a school. The students were moved to the Gillespie High School and Middle School campus, where they finished the remainder of the year on a split shift schedule. High school and middle school students attended school from 6:30am to noon, and elementary aged students attended from 12:30pm until 5:00 pm. The students started the 2010 school year on the split shift. On November 2, 2010, all students returned to a normal schedule, with the elementary children attending class in three different locations (modular units, middle school classrooms, and the S.S. Simon & Jude Catholic School). The district was allowed to collect only $350,000 in mine subsidence insurance due to limits imposed by the state of Illinois. The district is in line to receive funding from the Capital Development Board to help with the construction of a new elementary school. The school is responsible for 20% of the $22 million budget to build a new school. The school district is actively pursuing grants to fulfill their responsibility. The Ben-Gil Boosters, an organization formed to help raise funds for the construction of the new school, won $250,000 in April 2010 through Pepsi's Refresh Everything Campaign. The new school is adjacent to the district's middle school and high school in Gillespie. Its name has been changed to Ben-Gil Elementary School, to reflect both communities.

At a special CUSD 7 Board of Education meeting on August 16, 2017, the board approved a $4 million settlement with the Union Pacific Railroad, legal owners of the assets of the former Superior Coal Company, in connection with the subsidence. Originally, the district had been awarded $9.85 million in 2014, but Union Pacific appealed that ruling.

Geography
Benld is located in southeastern Macoupin County in the southwest corner of Cahokia Township. It is bordered to the south by the village of Sawyerville and to the northwest by the village of Mount Clare.

Illinois Route 4 runs along the western border of Benld, leading north  to Gillespie and south  to Staunton. Route 4 leads north  to Carlinville, the Macoupin county seat. Illinois Route 138 passes through the center of Benld as Central Street and South 8th Street, leading southeast  to White City and Interstate 55.

A small unnamed runs through the center of Benld, flowing south to Cahokia Creek, a southwest-flowing direct tributary of the Mississippi River.

Demographics

As of the census of 2000, there were 1,541 people, 676 households, and 415 families residing in the city. The racial makeup of the city was 98.25% White, 0.52% African American, 0.19% Native American, 0.45% from other races, and 0.58% from two or more races. Hispanic or Latino of any race were 0.97% of the population.

There were 676 households, of which 26.6% had children under the age of 18 living with them, 46.3% were married couples living together, 11.8% had a female householder with no husband present, and 38.5% were non-families. 34.0% of all households were made up of individuals, and 20.9% had someone living alone who was 65 years of age or older. The average household size was 2.28 and the average family size was 2.89.

In the city, the population was spread out, with 24.3% under the age of 18, 7.9% from 18 to 24, 27.1% from 25 to 44, 18.8% from 45 to 64, and 21.9% who were 65 years of age or older. The median age was 37 years. For every 100 females, there were 90.0 males. For every 100 females age 18 and over, there were 84.5 males.

The median income for a household in the city was $30,395, and the median income for a family was $36,953. Males had a median income of $30,054 versus $19,400 for females. The per capita income for the city was $15,521. About 9.7% of families and 14.3% of the population were below the poverty line, including 22.7% of those under age 18 and 7.0% of those age 65 or over.

Notable people
A. C. Bartulis (1927-2011), politician and businessman; born in Benld

See also
 List of cities in Illinois

References

Cities in Illinois
Cities in Macoupin County, Illinois
Populated places established in 1903
1903 establishments in Illinois